Hadrianus is an extinct genus of tortoise belonging to the Testudinidae found in the United States, the Yolomécatl Formation of Mexico, the Alai Beds of Kyrgyzstan and Spain and believed to be the oldest true tortoise known.  The genus is thought to be closely related to the genus Manouria.  The genus may have evolved in the subtropics of Asia and subsequently migrated to North America and Europe.

References 

Prehistoric life of Europe
Hadrianus (genus)
Eocene reptiles of North America
Prehistoric turtle genera
Taxa named by Edward Drinker Cope
Extinct turtles